Of Lost Love is a 1998 Italian drama film directed by Michele Placido. For her performance Giovanna Mezzogiorno won the Pasinetti Award at the 55th Venice International Film Festival  and the 1999 Nastro d'Argento for Best Actress,  while her co-star Fabrizio Bentivoglio was awarded David di Donatello for Best Supporting Actor.  The Mezzogiorno's character is inspired by teacher Liliana Rossi.

Plot 
In the 1950s a young teacher, close to the ideals of the left, tries to help the most vulnerable people through teaching.

Cast 

 Giovanna Mezzogiorno: Liliana
 Fabrizio Bentivoglio: Antonio
 Rocco Papaleo: Cucchiaro
 Michele Placido: Don Gerardo
 Enrico Lo Verso: Dr. Satriano
 Pietro Pischedda: Gerardo
 Sergio Rubini: Italo

References

External links

1998 films
Italian drama films
Films directed by Michele Placido
1998 drama films
Films set in Basilicata
Social realism in film
Films about educators
1990s Italian films